RockOpera Praha is a music theatre in Prague, Czech Republic.  It has one of the largest auditoriums in the capital, with over 900 seats, and has staged many popular musicals as well as a whole array of cultural events.

References

External links

Theatres in Prague
1999 establishments in the Czech Republic
Theatres completed in 1999
Music venues completed in 1999
Music venues in Prague
20th-century architecture in the Czech Republic